György Telegdy (10 May 1927 – 8 January 2022) was a Hungarian basketball player. He competed in the men's tournament at the 1952 Summer Olympics.

References

External links
 

1927 births
2022 deaths
Hungarian men's basketball players
Olympic basketball players of Hungary
Basketball players at the 1952 Summer Olympics
Basketball players from Budapest